Robert Digby may refer to:

Robert Digby (courtier) (1574–1618)
Robert Digby, 1st Baron Digby (c. 1599–1642)
Robert Digby, 3rd Baron Digby (1654–1677)
Robert Digby (died 1726), English Member of Parliament for Warwickshire
Robert Digby (Royal Navy officer), English Member of Parliament for Wells 1757–1761

See also
Robert James Thomas Digby-Jones, Scottish recipient of the VC